= José Álvares de Azevedo =

Patron of education for the blind

José Álvares de Azevedo (8 April 1834 – 17 March 1854) was a Brazilian educationist. He is titled the Patron of Education for the Blind. He took the initiative to found the first school for blind people in Brazil.

== Life ==
Azevedo was born on 8 April 1834 in Rio de Janeiro, Brazil. He was blind from birth. Despite the blindness from birth, he was extremely inquisitive. He always wished to experience the world through touch. Considering his quest for knowledge, his family sent him to the Royal Institute of Blind Young People in Paris, the only school specialized in education for the blind, from age 10 to 16. After completing the education, he came back to Brazil in 1850. He decided to create a school for blind people. Finally, he succeeded in his pursuit. He opened the country's first school for the blind, the Imperial Instituto dos Meninos Cegos (or the Imperial Institute of Blind Children).

== Death ==
He died on 17 March 1854 because of tuberculosis.

== Tribute ==
To mark his achievements, his birthday is National Braille Day.
